Mustafa Rahmi Arslan (1874 –1947) was a Turkish politician, who was a prominent member of the Committee of Union and Progress (CUP)..

During the Late Ottoman genocides, Rahmi Bey went to significant lengths to protect the Christian and European populations of Smyrna from deportation, exile and murder; often defying direct orders from the Ottoman Government in Istanbul.

Education and early life 
Rahmi Arslan was born into a wealthy family in Selanik and attended primary school in his hometown. He studied law in Constantinople, but shortly before the completion of his studies, he was arrested and prosecuted for his membership in the CUP, following which he left the Ottoman Empire and went into exile in Europe.

Political career 

It was in exile in Geneva, where got to know CUP co-founder Abdullah Cevdet, with whom he tried to establish a Geneva branch of the CUP in the 1890s. By 1906, together with Talaat Pasha and  Djemal Pasha, he was one of the co-founders of the Ottoman Freedom Society in Selanik, society which supported the Young Turk Revolution. During World War I, he acted as the Governor of Izmir, and resisted attempts to Turkify the city, even at great risk to his own safety  . He was arrested by the Allied forces in January 1919, and later one of the Malta exiles prosecuted for crimes committed during World War I. Following his return to Turkey, he was accused of having been involved in an assassination attempt against Mustafa Kemal (Atatürk) in 1926. He then left Turkey an only returned in 1933. He died in 1947.

References 

1874 births
1947 deaths
Place of death missing
Politicians from Thessaloniki
20th-century Turkish politicians
Turkish nationalists
Committee of Union and Progress politicians
Malta exiles
Istanbul University Faculty of Law alumni
Expatriates from the Ottoman Empire in Switzerland